Specimen Mountain, elevation , is a summit in the Front Range of northern Colorado. The mountain is north of Milner Pass in Rocky Mountain National Park.

Historical names
Geode Mountain
Mountain Smokes
Specimen Mountain – 1932

Geology
Specimen Mountain is a red-tinted, extinct volcano that was last active around 27 million years ago. At that time, it was probably more conical in shape and much higher than it is now. Roadcuts near Poudre Lake contain some of the yellowish ash its eruptions spewed out.

See also

List of Colorado mountain ranges
List of Colorado mountain summits
List of Colorado fourteeners
List of Colorado 4000 meter prominent summits
List of the most prominent summits of Colorado
List of Colorado county high points

References

External links

Mountains of Rocky Mountain National Park
Mountains of Grand County, Colorado
Mountains of Larimer County, Colorado
North American 3000 m summits
Great Divide of North America